William J. Plant (1847 – April 7, 1905) was an Irish-American politician in New York.

Life 
Plant was born in 1847 in Ireland. He immigrated to New York in 1848, when he was only one. He and his parents Humphrey and Margaret moved to Brooklyn shortly after immigrating.

After serving in the Navy for a few years, he worked as a shipping clerk for Stafford Ink Company for twenty years.

In 1886, Plant unsuccessfully ran as Brooklyn Supervisor under the United Labor Party. In 1888, he was elected Master Workman of Advance Assembly 1562 of the Knights of Labor.

Plant was elected in 1891 to the New York State Assembly as a Democrat, representing the Kings County 2nd District. He served in the Assembly in 1892, 1893, and 1894.

After he left the Assembly, Plant began work as a contractor. Among his contracts was supplying horses and wagons for the Brooklyn Post Office. He was a member of several societies, including the Royal Arcanum, the Catholic Benevolent Legion, the Knights of Columbus, and the Benevolent and Protective Order of Elks.

His wife was Louisa, who died in 1895. Their children were William, Edward, Humphrey, Mary, Loretta, Margaret, Catherine, and Elizabeth.

Plant died from heart failure on April 7, 1905, in his home on 105 Adams Street. He was buried in Holy Cross Cemetery.

References

External links 

 Political Graveyard

1847 births
1905 deaths
19th-century American politicians
19th-century American military personnel
Burials at Holy Cross Cemetery, Brooklyn
Irish emigrants to the United States (before 1923)
Irish sailors in the United States Navy
Democratic Party members of the New York State Assembly
American trade unionists of Irish descent
Knights of Labor people